Such Pretty Forks in the Road is the ninth (and seventh international) studio album by Canadian-American singer-songwriter Alanis Morissette, released on July 31, 2020, through Epiphany Music and Thirty Tigers in North America, and by RCA and Sony Music in the United Kingdom and Europe. It is Morissette's first studio album in eight years, following 2012's Havoc and Bright Lights.

The album was preceded by the singles "Reasons I Drink" and "Smiling", the latter being a new song written for the Jagged Little Pill stage musical. The album debuted at number 16 on the US Billboard 200 and number one on the US Top Rock Albums charts, earning 23,000 album-equivalent units in its first week. The album won Adult Contemporary Album of the Year Award at the 2021 Juno Awards.

Background
Morissette had been working on the album since at least mid-2017. In August 2017 on Anna Faris' podcast Unqualified, Morissette revealed the name of a new song called "Reckoning". She described this song as "patriarchy falling down", and said it was in reference to her day in court in regards to the trial in which others were accused of embezzling from her. In early October 2017, on her own podcast Conversation with Alanis Morissette, she detailed a new song called "Diagnosis", in which she describes postpartum depression and how she felt better when she knew what was going on with herself. Later that month at the tribute concert Linkin Park and Friends: Celebrate Life in Honor of Chester Bennington, Morissette was invited as a guest to perform "Castle of Glass" and a new song of hers called "Rest". She said that she had been working with Mike Farrell and writing new demos.

In March 2018, Morissette previewed another new song from the album called "Ablaze", dedicated to her children. In August 2018 on Laura Whitmore's Sunday Session on BBC Radio 5 Live, she stated that the new album would be a "piano record", and that "Rest" would make the final cut. In October 2018, Morissette said that 23 songs would be on the new album when replying to fans.

In August 2019, Morissette revealed that she was working with Alex Hope and Catherine Marks on her as-of-then untitled record. She announced the album in December 2019, also debuting "Reasons I Drink" and the song "Smiling" during a performance at the Apollo Theater in New York City on 2 December, the latter of which was described as "sanguine" by Suzy Exposito of Rolling Stone.

On April 16, 2020, Morissette announced that the album would be postponed to a later date from its initial release date of May 1, 2020, due to the COVID-19 pandemic, and announced that "Diagnosis", a track about Morissette's experiences with post-partum depression, would be released as the third single on April 24, 2020.

Promotion
Morissette was scheduled to embark on a world tour for the 25th anniversary of her 1995 album Jagged Little Pill in June 2020, during which she would perform songs from her entire career, including songs from Such Pretty Forks in the Road. As of May 2020 the tour has been postponed to 2021 following concerns of the COVID-19 pandemic in the United States.

Critical reception

Such Pretty Forks in the Road received positive reviews from music critics. At Metacritic, which assigns a normalized rating out of 100 to reviews from mainstream publications, the album received a weighted average score of 71, based on 12 reviews, which indicates "generally favorable reviews".  
In addition to the Juno Award Adult contemporary Album of the year, which she won, Morissette was also nominated as Songwriter of the Year.

Commercial performance
Such Pretty Forks in the Road debuted at number 16 on the US Billboard 200 chart, earning 23,000 album-equivalent units (of which 20,000 copies were pure album sales) in its first week. The album also debuted at number one on the US Top Rock Albums chart, becoming her second number one album on that chart. Additionally, Such Pretty Forks in the Road debuted at number two on the US Billboards Independent Albums chart.

The album reached number 8 on the UK Albums Chart, her highest entry there since So Called Chaos which reached the same position in 2004.

Track listing

Personnel
Alanis Morissette – vocals, backing vocals
Alex Hope – guitars, synths, marxophone, programming, string arrangement
Michael Farrell – piano, synths, organ, marxophone, string arrangement
Catherine Marks – synths, programming, string arrangement
Adam 'Cecil' Bartlett – acoustic guitar, synths and programming
Victor Indrizzo – drums
Tyler Last – bass
Steven Milbourne – acoustic guitar
Chris J. Alderton – guitar
David Levita – guitar
Cedric Lemoyne – bass
Frank Turner – guitar
Chris Dugan - Mixing
Emily Lazar - Mastering Engineer

Such Pretty Forks in the Mix

Such Pretty Forks in the Mix is a remix extended play released on December 11, 2020, by Epiphany, Thirty Tigers, and He.She.They. Records. The EP features remixes from songs from Morissette's ninth studio album, Such Pretty Forks in the Road, by trans-inclusive female artists, as well as two performances recorded in March 2020 and taken from her live album Live at London's O2 Shepherd's Bush Empire, 2020. A portion of the proceeds went to Safe Place International, an organization helping LGBT refugees in Turkey and Greece.

Track listing

Charts

Weekly charts

Year-end charts

Release history

References

2020 albums
Alanis Morissette albums
RCA Records albums
Thirty Tigers albums
Albums produced by Alex Hope (songwriter)
Albums produced by Catherine Marks
Albums postponed due to the COVID-19 pandemic
Juno Award for Adult Contemporary Album of the Year albums